The Lake Superior Maritime Visitor Center is a museum in Duluth, Minnesota, operated by the United States Army Corps of Engineers.

Background 
The museum is in Duluth's Canal Park near the Aerial Lift Bridge and overlooks the entrance to the Duluth-Superior harbor.

The museum and grounds are all property of the U.S. federal government.  All visitors are welcome to visit this museum without paying.  Donations are accepted by the Lake Superior Marine Museum Association, and support general maintenance and upkeep of the building, new exhibit development and acquisition, and staffing.

Exhibits demonstrate the history and operations of upper Great Lakes commercial shipping and the Aerial Lift Bridge.  Many visitors particularly enjoy the three historically accurate replica cabins and a pilothouse from typical ships which plowed the waves of Lake Superior in years past.  A three-story steam engine, 50 scale models and many interactive displays are available for visitors to explore.

Thousand-foot-long freighters pass within  of the building, underneath the Aerial Lift Bridge, which lifts up to allow them to pass through.

See also
 List of museums in Minnesota

References

External links
 Lake Superior Marine Museum Association - official site
Duluth Seaway Port Authority Article

Maritime museums in Minnesota
Museums in Duluth, Minnesota
Visitor centers in the United States
Museums of the Great Lakes